Criticism of the Seventh-day Adventist Church includes observations made about its teachings, structure, and practices or theological disagreements from various individuals and groups.

Major critics
One of the most prominent early critics of the church was D. M. Canright, an early leader of the movement in the late 19th century who apostatized and recanted but later left and became a Baptist pastor.

In the middle of the 20th century, evangelical Walter Martin and the Christian Research Institute concluded that the Seventh-day Adventist church is a legitimate Christian body with some heterodox doctrines and stated, "They are sound on the great New Testament doctrines including grace and redemption through the vicarious offering of Jesus Christ 'once for all'. However, other scholars such as Calvinist theologian Anthony A. Hoekema, who did not agree with the Adventist view that Jacobus Arminius's theology was in line with Adventism, believed that Adventism was based on a Wesleyan/Arminian stream of theology, and grouped Seventh-day Adventism with Mormonism, Jehovah's Witnesses and Christian Science in his book The Four Major Cults.

In debates regarding the inspiration of Ellen White during the 1970s, Adventists Walter T. Rea and Ronald Numbers wrote books criticizing Ellen White and accusing her of plagiarizing vitalist authors. This revived a controversy that first emerged in the late 19th century when Conybeare and Howson sued White and her publisher for allegedly plagiarizing their 1855 book, Life and Epistles of the Apostle Paul, in preparing her own book, Sketches from the Life of Paul.

The most recent and comprehensive critique of Ellen G. White is a highly sourced, well-documented book, Ellen G. White a Psychobiography, by Steve Daily, a church historian and licensed psychologist. This book describes the pathology of Ellen G. White, the "prophetic" co-founder of the Seventh-day Adventist Church. In reference to this explosive volume, John Dart, a longtime religion editor of the Los Angeles Times wrote "a devastating work. What Numbers and Rea started this book will finish."

Church doctrine

Trinitarian views
Some Christian critics of Adventism contend that the current Adventist view of the Trinity is not orthodox and/or constitutes Tritheism.

Several Seventh-day Adventist scholars have acknowledged that the Adventist view of the Trinity tends to differ in some aspects from the inherited traditional Christian view of the doctrine. According to Dr. Jerry Moon, emeritus professor at the Seventh-day Adventist Theological Seminary, Ellen White, the co-founder of the church, taught that the Father, Son, and Holy Spirit are three distinct beings yet are united as one in the Godhead.

Moon explains that Ellen White was raised trinitarian but adopted a different view from the traditional one and contends that White's later writings on the Trinity is not the same as the view rejected by the early Adventists.

Critic A. Leroy Moore contends Adventists reject the orthodox view, and contends that the view probably would have been branded as Arian by the orthodox.

"What James [SDA co-founder James White, husband of Ellen White] and the other men were opposed to, we are just as opposed to as they were. Now, their solution to that, at that time, they didn't see any solution by retaining the Trinity concept, and getting rid of its distortions. But, in reality, we have been faithful to their commitment, and I know of nothing that they were objecting to, in objecting to Trinitarianism, that we have not also objected to." In 1876, James White discussed the differences between Seventh Day Baptists and Seventh-day Adventists, he observed, "The S. D. Adventists hold the divinity of Christ so nearly with the trinitarian, that we apprehend no trial here."

"A major development [in Adventism] since 1972 has been the quest to articulate biblical presuppositions grounding a biblical doctrine of the Trinity, clearly differentiated from the dualistic presuppositions that undergird the traditional creedal statements."

"In many ways the philosophical assumptions and presuppositions of our worldview are different from traditional Christianity and bring different perspectives on some of these old issues. We do not accept the traditional Platonic dualistic worldview and metaphysics that were foundational to the church fathers' theology of the Trinity, one of these being the concept of the immortality of the soul."

Christology
It has been alleged by the Christian Research Institute that Adventism teaches that Christ had a sinful nature. Adventists hold that Christ came as fully man and yet still fully divine, and covering the nature of Christ state that Jesus Christ inherited Adam's fallen nature that has been passed on to all of humanity but did not sin. Such a belief is based on the following texts:

"For what the law could not do in that it was weak through the flesh, God did by sending His own Son in the likeness of sinful flesh, on account of sin: He condemned sin in the flesh" (Romans 8:3 NKJV)

"For we do not have a High Priest who cannot sympathize with our weaknesses, but was in all points tempted as we are, yet without sin." (Hebrews 4:15 NKJV)

"...concerning his Son (Jesus), who was descended from David according to the flesh..." (Romans 1:3 ESV)

"Therefore, in all things He had to be made like His brethren, that He might be a merciful and faithful High Priest in things pertaining to God, to make propitiation for the sins of the people." (Hebrews 2:17 NKJV)

Adventist doctrine is that God took "man's nature in its fallen condition," but yet "Christ did not in the least participate in its sin", which shows Christ with post fall humanity but a sinlessness of Adam before the fall Mainstream Adventists believe that Jesus was beset with all of the moral weaknesses and frailties that ordinary humans experience. However, he did not have the propensity to sin. Christ could be tested by temptation, but like Adam before the fall, did not have the ungodly desires or sinful inclinations of humanity. Ellen White states "The Lord Jesus came to our world, not to reveal what a God could do, but what a man could do, through faith in God’s power to help in every emergency. Man is, through faith, to be a partaker in the divine nature, and to overcome every temptation wherewith he is beset."

Despite this, he managed to resist temptation both from within and without, and lived a perfectly obedient life. Jesus is therefore set forth as the supreme Example in whose footsteps Christians must follow. The fact that he overcame sin completely, despite having no advantage over other human beings, demonstrates that we too can live a life of complete obedience by trusting in him. Ellen White states "The Lord Jesus came to our world, not to reveal what a God could do, but what a man could do, through faith in God’s power to help in every emergency. Man is, through faith, to be a partaker in the divine nature, and to overcome every temptation wherewith he is beset."

Adventists are firm believers that people are saved by faith and not through works, however works are the necessary fruits that are proof of God truly being given a place in our lives.

And:

Investigative judgment and salvation
The Investigative Judgment doctrine is defined in the Church's list of fundamental beliefs. In reviewing this uniquely Seventh-day Adventist doctrine, non-Adventist critics contend that it is not Biblical teaching.

Adventists answer that the Investigative Judgment doctrine is not about celestial geography, that a judgment of works is compatible with the gospel, and that Scriptures like  and Matthew 25 teach an end-time judgment of the Church. They believe that the "end time gospel" of  did not sound in the first century but applies to our time.

The essence of Old Testament sanctuary typology that Adventists rely on for their eschatology may be summarized as follows:

 The sanctuary services emphasized three aspects of Christ’s work for us: sacrifice, mediation, and judgment.

As to the 1844 date, Walter Martin wrote:

 Lest anyone reading the various accounts of the rise of "Millerism" in the United States come to the conclusion that Miller and his followers were "crackpots" or "uneducated tools of Satan," the following facts should be known: The Great Advent Awakening movement that spanned the Atlantic from Europe was bolstered by a tremendous wave of contemporary biblical scholarship. Although Miller himself lacked academic theological training, actually scores of prophetic scholars in Europe and the United States had espoused Miller's views before he himself announced them.

Catholicism In Eschatology

Like the Protestant Reformers, some writings of Ellen White speak against the Catholic Church in preparation for a nefarious eschatological role as the antagonist against God's remnant church (the Seventh-day Adventist Church) and that the papacy is the beast that emerges from the sea (Ap 13).  Many Protestant reformers such as Martin Luther, John Knox, William Tyndale and others held similar beliefs about the Catholic Church and the papacy when they broke away from the Catholic Church during the reformation. Unlike most Protestant denominations the Adventist Church opposes the ecumenical movement.

Soteriology 
Seventh Day Adventism has been attacked for allegedly holding semi-pelagian soteriological views, for example Roger E. Olson said: "Mormons and Seventh-day Adventists have tended to promote Semi Pelagian views of salvation, although the latter have been moving more toward orthodox Protestant Christianity in the second half of the twentieth century".

See also
Criticism of Ellen G. White

References

 Citations

External links
Opposition to Adventism
 Life Assurance Ministries
 Cult or Christian: Does Seventh-day Adventism Teach the Trinity?
 exAdventist Outreach
 Let Us Reason
 Oliver, Timothy (1996) Seventh-day Adventist Church Profile, The Watchman Expositor, Vol. 13, No. 1, Watchman Fellowship ministry
 Catholic.com

Addressing opposition claims 
 Official Ellen G. White Estate site
 Biblical Research Institute

Seventh-day Adventist Church
Seventh-day Adventist Church
Seventh-day Adventist Church